Shane Gilmore is a former Australian rules footballer, who played for the Fitzroy Football Club in the Victorian Football League (VFL).

References

External links

Fitzroy Football Club players
1958 births
Living people
Australian rules footballers from Victoria (Australia)